The Lyndon Carnegie Library, located at 127 E. Sixth in Lyndon, Kansas, is a Classical Revival-style Carnegie library which was built in about 1911.  It was listed on the National Register of Historic Places in 1987.

It was funded by an $8,000 Carnegie Foundation grant.

References

Libraries on the National Register of Historic Places in Kansas
Neoclassical architecture in Kansas
Library buildings completed in 1911
Osage County, Kansas